The Hann River is a river in Far North Queensland, Australia.

The headwaters of the river rise in the Great Dividing Range on Cape York Peninsula northeast of the settlement of Kimba. The river flows in a north easterly direction, joined by four minor tributaries, crosses the Peninsula Developmental Road and then enters the Rinyirru National Park where it forms a series of braided channels then re-forms to a single channel and discharges into the North Kennedy River northwest of Lakefield. The river descends  over its  course.

The floodplain is composed of reddish grey sand loam produced from the underlying sand material of Cainozoic age. The underlying geology is predominantly alluvium of Quaternary age with areas of older rock made up of sandstone of Middle Jurassic age in the Bathurst Range and the granite of Late Silurian age in the Great Dividing Range of the upper catchment. Fringing vegetation is made up of Stringybark, Bloodwood, Moreton Bay Ash and Ironbark trees with a ground cover of coarse grasses such as speargrass.

The river was named after the explorer and pastoralist William Hann who explored the area in 1872. It was named by the prospector James Venture Mulligan in 1875.

See also

References

Rivers of Far North Queensland
Bodies of water of the Coral Sea